Virgin Islands competed at the 2019 World Aquatics Championships in Gwangju, South Korea from 12 to 28 July.

Swimming

Virgin Islands entered three swimmers.

Men

Women

References

Nations at the 2019 World Aquatics Championships
Virgin Islands at the World Aquatics Championships
World Aquatics Championships